Andreas Hofer (born 8 February 1991 in Wiener Neustadt) is an Austrian former professional cyclist, who rode professionally between 2010 and 2020 for the ,  and . He now works as a directeur sportif for UCI Continental team .

Major results

2009
 1st Stage 7 Tour de l'Abitibi
 2nd Time trial, National Junior Road Championships
2011
 National Road Championships
1st  Time trial
1st  Under-23 road race
1st  Under-23 time trial
3rd Road race
2012
 National Road Championships
1st  Under-23 time trial
3rd Time trial
 3rd Duo Normand (with Robert Vrečer)
2013
 National Road Championships
1st  Under-23 time trial
3rd Time trial
2014
 3rd Time trial, National Road Championships
 3rd Overall Kreiz Breizh Elites
 6th Race Horizon Park 1
 10th Overall Tour of China I
2015
 6th Belgrade–Banja Luka I
2017
 8th Overall Tour of Szeklerland
2018
 5th Croatia–Slovenia

References

External links

1991 births
Living people
Austrian male cyclists
Sportspeople from Wiener Neustadt
European Games competitors for Austria
Cyclists at the 2015 European Games
21st-century Austrian people